Kordíky is a village and municipality in Banská Bystrica District in the Banská Bystrica Region of central Slovakia.

History
In historical records the village was first mentioned in 1690.

Geography
The municipality lies at an altitude of 849 metres and covers an area of 9.973 km2. It has a population of about 281 people.

References

Villages and municipalities in Banská Bystrica District